This is a list of North Korean films and film series from September 1948 to present. Films, and film parts or halves with names, that are part of film series or multi-part films are not included separately to keep the list shorter and more readable. For South Korean films from September 1948 see list of South Korean films. Earlier Korean films made during Japanese rule are in the list of Korean films of 1919–1948. For an alphabetical list of Korean-language films, see List of Korean-language films.

List of films

See also

 Cinema of North Korea
 List of North Korean television series
 On the Art of the Cinema

Notes

References

Footnotes

Works cited

External links
 North Korean film at the Internet Movie Database
 Korea Film Corporation 
 DPRK Film Database

North Korea
 
Films